Ajay Chhabra (born 28 November 1970) is a British television and theatre actor, director, producer and comedian of Indo-Fijian heritage, who is best known for playing Anil in The Basil Brush Show, The Vicar, Suresh Mattai in the BBC Radio series The Archers and the Defense Barrister George Karnad in Holby City. Ajay is Artistic Director of Nutkhut, and founder of the London Mela (Europe's largest South Asian festival).

Early life 
Before turning professional he worked in the Hotel and Events sector. He studied Anthropology at Goldsmiths College, University of London and Hospitality Management at Westminster Hotel School and the University of North London. He trained at Grosvenor House Hotel and Beck Hotels in Austria, completing his training at the University of Innsbruck.

Career 
He created and played Stanley in Kafka's Dick by Alan Bennett and developed his own series Planet Ajay for the BBC, creating and playing four characters – himself, his evil twin brother, Badjay, a space serpent: Jaleel the Eel and his maternal grandmother, Naniji, using green screen technology.

In 1995 he made his West End debut in Indian Ink by Tom Stoppard alongside Felicity Kendal, Art Malik and the late Margaret Tyzack. He has worked for BBC Radio Drama reading works exclusively for V S Naipaul and Salman Rushdie.

From 2002 to 2007, he played Anil the café owner in the children's TV series The Basil Brush Show.

Come to Kochi, an 8 part series which Chhabra presented from the Southern Indian state of Kerala, is now taught as part of the National Curriculum.

He has directed and performed for Diesel Clothing Company in Italy, Greece, Holland, Germany and Denmark, bringing together fashion and theatre in creating a theatrical presentation of Spring/Summer collections with catwalk models, classical dancers and actors.

In 2011 he created and performed a virtual customer of the future for the Senior Executive board of HSBC bank in Canary Wharf, London and at its headquarters in Hong Kong, enabling senior directors to execute future customer account profiles.

As part of the centenary commemorations of the First World War, created by Chhabra, over 50,000 people experienced Dr Blighty at Brighton's Royal Pavilion Gardens. The projections spread far and wide on social media and were seen by over a million people online.

Dr Blighty threw a spotlight on the Indians who travelled across the world to fight for the Allies during the First World War. More than one million men travelled from India to fight in the Great War, and the collective experiences of these volunteer forces constitute one of the great untold stories in military history. The event successfully brought to life the experiences of the injured Indian soldiers sent to recuperate in Brighton and the locals who came to know and care for them.

Chhabra is a board member of The Independent Street Arts Network (ISAN) and a member of the Mayor of London Cultural Leadership Board.

Filmography

Film

Television

References

External links 

BBC.co.uk
TV.com

1970 births
20th-century English male actors
21st-century English male actors
20th-century English comedians
21st-century English comedians
Alumni of Goldsmiths, University of London
British male actors of Indian descent
English male film actors
English male stage actors
English male television actors
English people of Indo-Fijian descent
Living people